Gheorghe Lazăr is a commune in Ialomița County, Muntenia, Romania. It is composed of a single village, Gheorghe Lazăr.

References

Communes in Ialomița County
Localities in Muntenia